Mount Belecz is an ice-covered, flat-topped mountain, with a peak of 2,120 m, standing 6 nautical miles (11 km) northeast of Mount Ruth Gade in the Quarles Range. First mapped from ground surveys and air photos by the Byrd Antarctic Expedition, 1928–30. Named by Advisory Committee on Antarctic Names (US-ACAN) for Dan M. Belecz, meteorologist with the South Pole Station winter party in 1962.

Mountains of the Ross Dependency
Amundsen Coast